Ihsane Jarfi (1980 – 2012) was murdered in Liège, Belgium in April 2012.  It was the first case of homophobic murder recognized under Belgian law.

Incident
Ihsane Jarfi, a 32-year-old Belgian gay man, disappeared on April 22, 2012. He was last seen leaving the Open Bar, a gay bar in the center of Liège, in a car with four other men.

According to one of the four suspects arrested, they first struck him while in the car "to teach the homo a lesson". His attackers then stripped him and beat him, causing very serious injuries, including 17 rib fractures. They stole his money and his cell phone and left him naked and bleeding. The medical examiner established that he died between 4 and 6 hours after he was left in a field. His body was found by two hikers nine days later, on May 1, 2012.

They were also charged with theft with several aggravating circumstances, including that of having committed murder to facilitate the theft or ensure impunity, torture and inhuman and degrading treatment, acts of serious humiliation or degradation, and kidnapping.

In December 2014, following a trial that began in November, the Liège Assize Court convicted Mutlu Kizilaslan, Jérémy Wintgens and Eric Parmentier to life imprisonment for having committed the homophobic assassination of Ihsane Jarfi. Jonathan Lekeu was sentenced to 30 years in prison for a homophobic murder.

Media

Book 
 Ihsane Jarfi's father, of North African origin, wrote a book in 2013 entitled Ihsane Jarfi: le couloir du deuil (Ihsane Jarfi:  The Passageway of Mourning) , in which he discusses the events leading up to the murder and condemns intolerance, whether it affects homosexuals, Muslims, or any other minority.

Television documentary 
 Le crépuscule d'Ihsane (The Twilight of Ihsane) broadcast November 20, 2013 and July 23, 2014, on  sur la Une (RTBF).

Theater 
 La reprise, Histoire(s) du théâtre (I) conceived and directed by Milo Rau was presented at Créations Studio in Brussels in 2017 and 2018.  It was a five-act narrative of the events leading up to the murder presented through video and live performance.

Film 
 Animals, a 2021 film, was inspired by the murder of Ishane Jarfi and is dedicated to his memory.

See also 
 LGBT rights in Belgium

External links 
 Ihsane Jarfi Foundation

References

1980 births
2012 deaths
2012 in Belgium
2012 in LGBT history
2012 murders in Belgium
April 2012 crimes
Deaths by beating in Europe
LGBT rights in Belgium
Violence against gay men